The 2003 Big East men's basketball tournament, a part of the 2002–03 NCAA Division I men's basketball season, took place from March 12 – March 15, 2003 at Madison Square Garden in New York City. Its winner will receive the Big East Conference's automatic bid to the 2003 NCAA tournament. It was a single-elimination tournament with four rounds and the four highest seeds (two from each Big East division) receive byes in the first round. The 6 Big East teams with the best conference records from both the East and West Divisions of the Big East Conference were invited to participate. Boston College, who had an identical 10–6 record as Connecticut, received the #1 seed from the East Division due to a tie breaker.  Likewise, Syracuse, who had an identical 13–3 conference record to Pitt, received the #1 seed from West Division due to tiebreakers. Virginia Tech from the East Division and Rutgers from the West Division failed to make the tournament.
Pittsburgh defeated Connecticut, 74–56, in the finals to earn its first Big East tournament championship.

Bracket

* denotes an overtime (OT) period

Note: By finishing in last place during the regular season in their respective divisions, Virginia Tech and Rutgers did not qualify for the tournament.

Championship game

On March 15, Pittsburgh won their first-ever Big East tournament, defeating Connecticut 74–56. They led by one at half-time, but quickly extended their lead in the second half. Jaron Brown led the Panthers with a career-high 19 points. Brown converted all six of his free throw attempts and was 6-of-9 from the field. He added ten rebounds to notch his fourth career double-double. Julius Page and Brandin Knight finished with 16 points apiece, and Chevon Troutman had 12. Page, a junior, averaged 13.3 points and 3.7 rebounds on 47.1 percent shooting (16-for-37) in the three tournament games. He won the Tournament MVP award. Knight averaged 12.0 points, 5.3 assists, 3.3 steals, and 3.3 rebounds in the tournament.

It was the third straight title game reached for Pittsburgh. Howland and the Panthers lost to Uconn in double overtime in 2002. It tied the largest margin of victory for a Panther team in the Big East tournament. They also defeated Boston College by eighteen, winning 88–70 on March 8, 2000. The win was Pittsburgh's ninth in a row, tying their season high. They also won nine in a row to begin the season.

Awards
Dave Gavitt Trophy (Most Outstanding Player): Julius Page, Pittsburgh

All-Tournament Team
Brandin Knight, Pittsburgh
Ben Gordon, Connecticut
Emeka Okafor, Connecticut
Craig Smith, Boston College
Carmelo Anthony, Syracuse

References

External links
Big East website

Tournament
Big East men's basketball tournament
Basketball in New York City
College sports in New York City
Sports competitions in New York City
Sports in Manhattan
Big East men's basketball tournament
Big East men's basketball tournament
2000s in Manhattan
Madison Square Garden